Poona National Park is located in the Fraser Coast Region, Queensland, Australia. It is a wildlife refuge with some endangered trees and animals.

Geography 
The national park occupies the central and eastern parts of the locality of Boonooroo Plains and the northern part of Boonooroo. It is 210 km north of Brisbane and 6 km southeast from Maryborough. It is a wildlife refuge with some endangered trees and animals.

Facilities 
Mostly marshy and forested between rivers and the sea, this area has no designated walking trails. However, the park still permits fishing in a designated area at Kalah Creek, and encourages small nature-based activities such as photography. Camping is not allowed in the park.

See also

 Protected areas of Queensland

References 

National Parks on the Sunshine Coast, Queensland
Protected areas established in 1991
1991 establishments in Australia
Wide Bay–Burnett
Fraser Coast Region